Baidauli is a village development committee in India situated in the Mankapur (Assembly constituency) Tehsil of Gonda district in Uttar Pradesh.

References

Gonda district